Kan Rud (also Romanized as Kān Rūd and Kānrūd) is a village in Jereh Rural District, Jereh and Baladeh District, Kazerun County, Fars Province, Iran. At the 2006 census, its population was 253, in 53 families.

References 

Populated places in Kazerun County